The Cole Classic is an open-water swimming event, held annually at Manly in Sydney, Australia. Organisers publicise it as one of Australia's longest running ocean swims; historically it was viewed as one of the most prestigious open-water swims in Sydney. It was started by the Cole family in 1982, however is now organised by Fairfax Events (the same team behind the City2surf) for The Sydney Morning Herald, in conjunction with the Manly Life Saving Club.

The race takes place on the first Sunday in February. Originally staged at Bondi Beach, in 2007 it was relocated to Manly, on the northern side of Sydney Harbour. Coinciding with the move, a 1 km swim was added to the existing 2 km event, to encourage participation of novice swimmers. Both events now start from Shelly Beach and finish at Manly's Steyne Beach.

Popularity
Due to strong popular branding of both the swim and its location, the event is well-patronised by the general public, attracting upwards of 4,000 combined participants in the two race categories.

In 2010, Luane Rowe, 20, claimed the women's title in the 2 km event (26min) and came third overall, only beaten home by two men from the mixed elite starting group. Luane also came second in the 1 km race. Josh Beard, who was the second fastest male in 2010, claimed the 2010 Cole Classic men's trophy in a time of 24min. The oldest swimmer in the field in 2010 was 80-year-old John Kelso from Balgowlah who also won the 75-plus category.

Controversy
Controversy surrounded organisation of the event, with complaints about the 2009 event evident online, implying that buoys were placed incorrectly, reducing the 2 km event to approximately 1.2 km. This allegation would appear to be unsupported by the official results, which list the winning time as just under 22 minutes, consistent with competitive winning results for a 2 km ocean swim.

Questions have been raised online about the cut-off date for early-bird (discounted) registrations being around three weeks before the event, rather than the two-day period that is customary for most other NSW swims. This is due to the large size of the event, it is currently the largest swimming event in Australia. Early entries are promoted in order to avoid any race-day check-in as early-bird competitors receive their timing chip in the post. All finishers are awarded a commemorative medal (a new addition for the 2010 races), while the famous Cole plates are awarded to category winners and place-getters.

Organisers have responded positively and affirmatively to negative reports from the website ocean swims.com.au regarding the lack of promotion of the races that they receive commission from. The organisers actively promote independent ocean swims before, during and after the race, online and in emailed updates to competitors.

Fundraising program
All entrants are encouraged to sign-up for the on-line fundraising program.

References

Swimming competitions in Australia
Open water swimming competitions
Manly, New South Wales
Sports competitions in Sydney